Benny Kabur Harman (born in Manggarai on 19 September 1962) is an Indonesian politician and a member of the People's Representative Council of the Republic of Indonesia and member of the Democratic Party. Harman made news after rejecting the Omnibus Law on Job Creation and being denied to express his opinion by the Deputy Speaker of the DPR, Azis Syamsuddin.

While studying law at the University of Brawijaya, he was active at the Union of Catholic University Students of the Republic of Indonesia and served as the head of the Malang Branch from 1985 to 1990. He is also a founder and director of the Indonesian Legal Aid Association (PBHI) from 1995 to 1998.

Harman is part of Commission II of the DPR.

References 

Members of the People's Representative Council, 2014
Members of the People's Representative Council, 2019
University of Brawijaya alumni
University of Indonesia alumni
1962 births
Living people